The Mixed 10m Air Rifle Standing SH2 shooting event at the 2004 Summer Paralympics was competed  on 22 September. It was won by Mike Johnson, representing .

Preliminary

22 Sept. 2004, 14:00

Final round

22 Sept. 2004, 17:30

References

X